Warren Sallenback (born 16 July 1966) is a Canadian cyclist. He competed in the men's cross-country mountain biking event at the 1996 Summer Olympics.

References

External links
 

1966 births
Living people
Canadian male cyclists
Olympic cyclists of Canada
Cyclists at the 1996 Summer Olympics
Place of birth missing (living people)